The Private Secretary to the Sovereign is the senior operational member of the Royal Household of the Sovereign of the United Kingdom (as distinct from the Great Officers of the Household, whose duties are largely ceremonial). The Private Secretary is the principal channel of communication between the monarch and the governments in most of the Commonwealth realms. They also have responsibility for the official programme and correspondence of the Sovereign. Through these roles the position wields considerable influence. This is one of the most senior positions within the Royal Household.

The office of Private Secretary was first established in 1805.  the position has been held exclusively by men. One woman has served as both Deputy and Assistant Private Secretary and an additional two women have served as Assistant Private Secretaries. The current Private Secretary position is jointly held by Sir Clive Alderton and Sir Edward Young.

History
Colonel Herbert Taylor, who was appointed in 1805, is acknowledged as the first Private Secretary to the Sovereign. However, the office was not formally established until 1867. Constitutionally there was some opposition on the part of Ministers to the creation of an office which might grow to have considerable influence upon the Sovereign. However, it was soon realised that the Sovereign was in need of secretarial support, since his or her Ministers had ceased to provide daily advice and support with the growth of ministerial government. Queen Victoria did not have a Private Secretary until she appointed General Charles Grey to the office in 1861; her husband Prince Albert had effectively been her secretary until his death.

Functions
The principal functions of the office are:
 to act as a channel of communication between the Sovereign and his or her governments, and to advise the Sovereign on constitutional, political or governmental questions;
 to organise the official programme of the Sovereign, and to ensure its acceptability to both the Sovereign and the Government; these duties including drafting speeches, maintaining connection with other Households, the Royal Train, The King's Helicopter, No. 32 (The Royal) Squadron RAF, and the armed forces — the latter through the Defence Services Secretary; and 
 to deal with the Sovereign's official correspondence (including congratulatory messages), from members of the public, the Press Office, and the Court Circular; and also to deal with the Sovereign's private papers, the Royal Archives, and the monarchy's official website.

The position of Private Secretary is regarded as equivalent to that of the permanent secretary of a government department. The incumbent is always made a Privy Counsellor on appointment, and has customarily received a peerage upon retirement (a life peerage since 1972, although a small number have been given hereditary titles). Until 1965, peerages granted to Private Secretaries were hereditary baronies, with the exception of Lord Knollys, who was created a viscount in 1911. All Private Secretaries since the time of Lord Stamfordham have been created peers, with the exceptions of Sir Alexander Hardinge (inherited his father's barony in 1944), Sir Alan Lascelles (declined as he felt titles to be a show of self-importance) and Sir William Heseltine (who is an Australian).

Private Secretaries to the Sovereign are always appointed Knights Bachelor (Kt), or knights of one of the orders of chivalry, typically the Order of The Bath or The Royal Victorian Order. The same is true for Principal Private Secretaries to other members of the Royal Household, such as The Prince of Wales.

The Private Secretary is head of only one of the several operational divisions of the Royal Household.  However, he or she is involved in co-ordination between various parts of the Household, and has direct control over the Press Office, the Royal Archives, and the office of the Defence Services Secretary.

Liaison with the government
The Private Secretary is responsible for liaising with the Cabinet Secretary, the Privy Council Office (PCO), and the Ministry of Justice's Crown Office in relation to:
 appointments that are formally made by the Sovereign; 
 the scheduling of the meetings of the Privy Council; and 
 the transmission of official documents that need to be signed by the Sovereign.

Security
Reporting to the Private Secretary is the role of Director for Security Liaison which was established following a recommendation of the Security Commission in 2004. The post was first held by Brigadier Jeffrey Cook, OBE MC, who was in office 2004-2008. The Private Secretary has general oversight of security policy, though the Master of the Household is also involved, and the Keeper of the Privy Purse has responsibility for the ceremonial bodyguards, such as the Gentlemen at Arms and the Yeomen of the Guard.

List of Private Secretaries to the Sovereign since 1805

Deputy Private Secretaries to the Sovereign since 1972

Assistant Private Secretaries to the Sovereign since 1878

See also
 Canadian Secretary to the King
 Private secretary

Notes

References 

British monarchy
Positions within the British Royal Household
1805 establishments in the United Kingdom